Oliverotto Euffreducci, known as Oliverotto of Fermo (1475, Fermo – 31 December 1502, Senigallia), was an Italian condottiero and lord of Fermo during the pontificate of Alexander VI. His career is described in Niccolò Machiavelli's Il Principe.

Biography

Early life and rise to power

Euffreducci was born in Fermo. During his childhood, he was brought up by his uncle, Giovanni Fogliani after he was left fatherless. He was sent to serve as a soldier under the condottiero Paolo Vitelli in order to win high command. In 1495, he fought with Vitelli first at Pisa and then in Naples for the French. In 1499, the two were fighting for the Florentines against Pisa, but both were accused of treason by Florence. Vitelli was summarily put to death while Oliverotto was spared due to the intervention of the government of Fermo. He then united with Vitellozzo Vitelli, Paolo's brother, and both went into the service of Cesare Borgia. 

As his ambition grew, Oliverotto wanted to seize Fermo for himself. Consequently, he wrote to his uncle, claiming he wanted to meet him. Suspecting no foul play from his nephew, Fogliani brought the citizens of Fermo and lodged him in his own mansion. Soon, Oliverotto prepared a formal banquet in which he invited the prominent people of Fermo and his uncle. As Machiavelli put it:

Then, Oliverotto laid siege to the palace of the governing council, and, having scared them all, set up a government and gave himself absolute power. Later, he made himself a formidable ruler to all of his neighboring states.

Downfall and legacy
In May 1502, Oliverotto conquered Camerino for Cesare Borgia. However, realizing that the Duke was becoming stronger, he attended the meeting at La Magione with Giulio, Paolo and Francesco Orsini, Gian Paolo Baglioni, Pandolfo Petrucci, Vitelli and others, on 9 October. Although Oliverotto was against Paolo Orsini's line of reconciliation with Cesare Borgia, he nonetheless took Senigallia in Cesare's name. But this didn't change Borgia's secret design, and the Duke had him captured and strangled, together with Vitellozzo Vitelli, on 31 December 1502.  Oliverotto was succeeded as ruler by his son Ludovico, who ruled until he was killed at the Battle of Monto Giorgio in 1520, when Fermo became again directly subjected to the Holy See.

As with Agathocles of Syracuse, he is immortalized in Machiavelli's The Prince as one of the leaders who gained power via criminal means. He is portrayed as a violent and cunning character.

References

1475 births
1502 deaths
People from Fermo
15th-century condottieri
Italian murder victims
People murdered in Italy
Assassinated Italian politicians
Deaths by strangulation
16th-century condottieri